The Highway Code is a set of information, advice, guides and mandatory rules for road users in the United Kingdom. Its objective is to promote road safety. The Highway Code applies to all road users including pedestrians, horse riders and cyclists, as well as motorcyclists and drivers. It gives information on road signs, road markings, vehicle markings, and road safety. There are annexes on vehicle maintenance, licence requirements, documentation, penalties, and vehicle security.

The Highway Code was first published in 1931, and is regularly updated to reflect current practices. It is prepared by the Department for Transport and the Driver and Vehicle Standards Agency, and is published by The Stationery Office in electronic form and as a printed book.

The 17th edition (2022) introduced some significant changes. In particular, a new "hierarchy of road users" classifies road users according to their risk in the event of a collision, with the most vulnerable at the top.

The Great Britain version, available in English and Welsh, applies to England, Scotland and Wales, but region-specific signs such as driver location signs in England and bilingual signs in Scotland and Wales are not covered. There is a Northern Ireland version, available in English and Irish.

History

The Departmental Committee on the Regulation of Motor Vehicles announced in 1920 that "a compulsory and uniform code of signals for all road vehicles is to be brought into operation". Drivers in London had evolved a system for signalling their intentions to turn right or stop, using their arm, and this was seen to be of such benefit that it should be required and standardised as a code of behaviour across the country. The code allowed the driver to use either his own arm or a dummy arm – which had obvious benefits in wet weather for drivers with the luxury of an enclosed cab, or for drivers using left-hand-drive vehicles, as in imported American cars. The intention to bring in the compulsory code was delayed and in successive years the code was expanded including whip signals for horse-drawn vehicles, and signals made by policemen controlling junctions.

In 1923 a booklet costing one penny was published by His Majesty's Stationery Office and approved by the Home Office (and Scottish Office). Entitled Traffic Signals to be used by the Police and Drivers of Vehicles, this booklet arose from discussions between the Police and The Automobile Association. In subsequent years, in addition to being promoted by the automobile associations, the code was publicised using posters by the National Safety First Association (which still continues this work, having been renamed the Royal Society for the Prevention of Accidents in 1936).

The formal introduction of The Highway Code was one of the provisions of the wide-reaching Road Traffic Act 1930. Costing one penny, the first edition of the code was published on 14 April 1931. It contained 21 pages of advice, including the arm signals to be given by drivers and police officers controlling traffic. The second edition, considerably expanded, appeared in 1934, and now illustrated road signs for the first time. During its preparation the Ministry of Transport consulted with the Pedestrians' Association.

Further major revisions followed after the Second World War so that, for example, references to trams were removed after the 1954 version. (Blackpool was for decades the only place in the UK with a tram system. Tramway rules returned to the Code in 1994, after the first modern tram systems in Britain had opened.) Motorway driving was included in the fifth edition. The sixth edition, in 1968, used photographs as well as drawings for the first time, and also updated the illustrations of road signs to take the new 'continental' designs into account. The 70-page 1978 edition introduced the Green Cross Code for pedestrians and orange badges for unskilled drivers. The format was changed to a 'taller' size in the 1990s. An electronic Highway Code app followed in 2012. Following public consultations in 2020, a new "hierarchy of road users" was incorporated into the 17th edition (2022) which classifies road users according to their risk in the event of a collision, with the most vulnerable at the top.

Hierarchy of road users (2022 edition) 
The "hierarchy of road users", according to The Official Highway Code "is a concept that places those road users most at risk in the event of a collision at the top of the hierarchy". Three special rules are provided which cover the concept:

Rule H1 
Sets out the principle that those in charge of vehicles that can cause the greatest harm in the event of a collision bear the greatest responsibility to take care and reduce the danger they pose to others. The principle applies most strongly to drivers of large goods and passenger vehicles, vans/minibuses, cars/taxis and motorcycles. Cyclists, horse riders and drivers of horse drawn vehicles likewise have a responsibility to reduce danger to pedestrians.

Rule H2 – for drivers, motorcyclists, horse drawn vehicles, horse riders and cyclists 
At a junction, these road users should give way to pedestrians crossing or waiting to cross a road into which (or from which) they are turning.

Pedestrians have priority on zebra crossings and on shared use cycle tracks. Only pedestrians (including wheelchair and mobility scooter users) may use the pavement. Pedestrians may use any part of the road and may use cycle tracks as well as the pavement, unless there are signs to the contrary.

Rule H3 – for drivers and motorcyclists 
Drivers and motorcyclists should not cut across cyclists, horse riders or horse drawn vehicles going ahead when they are turning into or out of a junction or changing direction or lane (just as they would not turn across the path of another motor vehicle). The code says "do not turn at a junction if to do so would cause the [more vulnerable road user] going straight ahead to stop or swerve". This applies not only when the more vulnerable road user is on the road, but also when they are on a cycle lane or cycle track.

Legal aspects

Certain rules in The Highway Code are legal requirements, and are identified by the words 'must' or 'must not', presented in bold red block capitals. In these cases, the rules also include references to the corresponding legislation. Offenders may be cautioned, given licence penalty points, fined, banned from driving, or imprisoned, depending on the severity of the offence. Although failure to comply with the other rules would not, in itself, cause a person to be prosecuted, the Highway Code may be used in court under the Road Traffic Act 1988 to establish liability. These include advisory rules with wording 'should' and 'should not' or 'do' (or a simple imperative) and 'do not'. The latest official printed version of the Highway Code is the one in force at any time, but in legal proceedings the version current at the time of the incident applies.

The Road Traffic Act 1988 states:

Access

The currently applicable Highway Code for England, Scotland, and Wales is available to read online at the Highway Code Web site, with links to download as free PDF eBook, app, and audio book. A printed version is widely available for purchase.

See also
 Driver's manual, the United States equivalent of the Highway Code
Road Users' Code, the Hong Kong equivalent of The Highway Code
Malta's The Highway Code, the Maltese  Highway Code
Ireland's Rules of the Road, the Irish equivalent of the Highway Code
Road surface marking
Road marking machine
Traffic Signs Regulations and General Directions
Vienna Convention on Road Traffic
Vienna Convention on Road Signs and Signals

References

External links
 The Highway Code (in English)
 The Highway Code for Northern Ireland with links to English, Irish,  Polish, Lithuanian, Russian, Portuguese and Mandarin versions.
 
 

Road transport in the United Kingdom
Road safety in the United Kingdom
Road user guides
Transport policy in the United Kingdom
Road safety
Driving in the United Kingdom
1931 in the United Kingdom
British books
Publications established in 1931
1931 establishments in the United Kingdom